Conscious Party is Ziggy Marley and the Melody Makers' third album. It was released in 1988. This album became popular with the hits "Tumblin' Down" and "Tomorrow People". It won the Grammy Award for Best Reggae Album in 1989.

In 2009, "Tomorrow People" was voted the "85th Greatest One-Hit Wonder of the 80s" by VH1.

Track listing

Personnel
 Rita Marley - background vocals
 Jerry Harrison - Hammond organ
 Cedella Marley - background vocals
 Chris Frantz - producer
 Mulu Gessesse - guitar
 Zeleke Gessesse - bass
 Ziggy Marley - guitar, vocals, background vocals
 Stephen Marley - vocals, background vocals
 Dereje Makonnen - keyboards, composer
 Sharon Marley Pendergast - background vocals
 Lenny Pickett - clarinet, piccolo, saxophone, contrabass
 Gary Pozner - keyboards
 Melaku Retta - keyboards
 Keith Richards - lead guitar on "Lee and Molly"
 Chris Romanelli
 Glenn Rosenstein - engineer
 Mark Roule - tambourine
 Asrat Aemro Selassie - percussion, bongos, conga, tambourine, background vocals, vibraslap, cabassa, wood block
 Earl "Chinna" Smith - guitar
 Raphael W'Mariam - drums, timbales
 Franklyn "Bubbler" Waul - keyboards
 Laura Weymouth - background vocals
 Tina Weymouth - background vocals, producer

Charts

Weekly charts

Year-end charts

Singles

Certifications

References

1988 albums
Ziggy Marley and the Melody Makers albums
Ziggy Marley albums
Virgin Records albums
Grammy Award for Best Reggae Album